The prompter (sometimes prompt) in a theatre is a person who prompts or cues actors when they forget their lines or neglect to move on the stage to where they are supposed to be situated.

Nowadays, many of the earlier duties of the prompter are undertaken by the stage manager, who will have a copy of the script called the prompt book. This is the most definitive version of the script for any one performance, and will contain details of all cues, with their precise timings with respect to the action on stage. This allows the prompt to direct lighting, sound, flying effects and scene changes during a show. The prompt book also often contains blocking notes, so that the prompt is always aware of the intended positions and movements of all the actors on stage at any given time.

In some professional and high-quality community theatre productions, the prompt is never used during a performance to instruct actors if they forget a line or movement, only during a rehearsal. If prompting is absolutely necessary, it is done very quietly by another actor on-stage or the conductor of the pit orchestra.

The prompt is located on the stage, in the prompt corner or "prompt side".

In Elizabethan theatre the function of prompting was filled by the Book-Holder, who was also in charge of props and calls.

References

Sources

 Hartnoll, Phyllis and Peter Found, eds. 1996. The Concise Oxford Companion to the Theatre. Oxford: Oxford University Press. .
 Kennedy, Dennis, ed. 2010. The Oxford Companion to Theatre and Performance. Oxford: Oxford University Press. .
 Pavis, Patrice. 1998. Dictionary of the Theatre: Terms, Concepts, and Analysis. Trans. Christine Shantz. Toronto and Buffalo: University of Toronto Press. .
 Taylor, John Russell. 1993. The Penguin Dictionary of the Theatre. 3rd ed. London: Penguin. .

Stage terminology
Stagecraft
Theatrical occupations